Heleobia robusta is a species of very small aquatic snail, an operculate gastropod mollusk in the family Cochliopidae.

References

Cochliopidae
Gastropods described in 2004